Akani Simbine (born 21 September 1993) is a South African sprinter specialising in the 100 metres event. He was fifth at the 2016 Summer Olympics in the men's 100 metres and was the 100 metres African record holder with a time of 9.84 seconds set in July 2021 until broken by Ferdinand Omurwa in September 2021.

Simbine was a World Championships finalist in the men's 100 metres in 2017 (fifth) and 2019 (fourth), and was 100 metres champion at the 2018 African Championships and 2018 Commonwealth Games. In the 4 × 100 metres relay, he helped South Africa become champions at the African Championships in 2016 and 2018, and place second at the 2018 Commonwealth Games with a South African record time of 38.24 seconds. He anchored South Africa to gold at the 2021 World Relays. Simbine has finished inside the top 5 in the last four major championship 100m races, including 4th in 2019 World Athletics Championships – Men's 100 metres and Athletics at the 2020 Summer Olympics – Men's 100 metres missing out on the bronze medal to Canadian sprinter Andre De Grasse.

Biography

2013 World Championships
He competed in the 100 metres event at the 2013 World Championships in Athletics.

2015 Universiade
Whilst an Information Science student at the University of Pretoria, Simbine equalled the South African 100m record and set an event record on 9 July 2015 in his gold medal-winning run at the 2015 Universiade in Gwangju, South Korea.

2016 South African record and Olympic Games
Simbine again broke the South African 100m record with a time of 9.89 seconds at the Gyulai István Memorial in Székesfehérvár on 18 July 2016. He finished fifth in 9.94 seconds in the 100 m final of the 2016 Olympics in Rio de Janeiro on 14 August 2016.

2017
In the first meet of the 2017 IAAF Diamond League in Doha, Simbine won the 100 m event with a time of 9.99 seconds.

2018
Simbine won the 2018 Commonwealth Games 100 m final in 10.03 seconds, relegating pre-race favourite Yohan Blake into third.

2020

Simbine started his 2020 season with a 150 metre race at the University of Johannesburg Stadium on 14 February, equalling the South African record time (15.08) while jogging to the finish line, but with no wind information. He ran his first 100 m for the season on 14 March at the University of Pretoria Tuks Stadium. Unsure whether or not he would be able to compete later in the season because of the rapidly spreading COVID-19 pandemic, he pushed to the finish line in a world-leading time of 9.91 seconds in the heats.

Simbine stopped track training in March and didn't get permission to resume training again until July, weeks after other sports had resumed training after he pleaded with Athletics South Africa to allow athletes back onto the track. He would not be able to compete until leaving South Africa in mid-August for Europe, winning a series of 100 m competitions in Marseille, Rovereto, and Bellinzona in times of 10.19, 10.17, and 10.02 seconds respectively. He finished his season in September with a 100 m victory at the Rome Diamond League, trailing Arthur Cissé of the Ivory Coast for the first 85 m before passing to win in 9.96 seconds.

2021
Simbine started the season with a 10.00 seconds win in the 100 metres at the Athletix Invitational in Johannesburg on 23 March, which would have been a leading time but for the wind velocity, which was just over the allowable +2.0 m/s limit. He broke 10 seconds at the Gauteng North Championships at the University of Pretoria on 27 March, winning 9.99 seconds ahead of Gift Leotlela (10.20) into a –3.0 wind. According to SuperSport, Simbine claimed that the "windy conditions were some of the worst I ever raced in."

On 15 April at the South African Championships in Pretoria, Simbine competed in the men's 100 metres, finishing his first round heat in 10.11 seconds. He then won his semi-final in 9.82 seconds, the fastest he had ever run, but the wind was again over the limit for record purposes at +2.8 m/s. The next day, he clocked his 29th sub-10-second time with 9.99 seconds to win the final, finishing 0.17 seconds ahead of second placing Gift Leotlela's 10.16 seconds.

Two weeks later, on 2 May, Simbine anchored South Africa to gold in the men's 4 × 100 metres relay at the 2021 World Relays. He received the baton three metres behind Brazil's Paulo André de Oliveira but managed to close the gap and finish one-hundredth of a second ahead of Brazil with a time of 38.71 seconds.

On 6 July, racing at the Hungarian Athletics Grand Prix, Simbine set a new national and African record of 9.84 seconds in winning the final.

On 1 August, At the 2020 Summer Olympics, held in Tokyo, Japan, Simbine finished fourth in a time of 9.93 seconds, behind winner Lamont Marcell Jacobs of Italy, with a time of 9.80 seconds.

Statistics
Information from World Athletics profile unless otherwise noted.

Personal bests

International championship results

Circuit wins and national titles
Diamond League (100 m)
Doha: 2017
London: 2019
Rome: 2020
South African Championships
100 m: 2015, 2017, 2021
200 m: 2019

Seasonal bests

See also
 2020 in 100 metres

Notes

References

External links

 

1993 births
Living people
South African male sprinters
Sportspeople from Johannesburg
Athletes (track and field) at the 2014 Commonwealth Games
Athletes (track and field) at the 2018 Commonwealth Games
Commonwealth Games gold medallists for South Africa
Commonwealth Games medallists in athletics
World Athletics Championships athletes for South Africa
University of Pretoria alumni
Athletes (track and field) at the 2016 Summer Olympics
Olympic athletes of South Africa
Universiade medalists in athletics (track and field)
Universiade gold medalists for South Africa
Universiade bronze medalists for South Africa
African Championships in Athletics winners
South African Athletics Championships winners
Commonwealth Games gold medallists in athletics
Medalists at the 2015 Summer Universiade
Athletes (track and field) at the 2020 Summer Olympics
Athletes (track and field) at the 2022 Commonwealth Games
Medallists at the 2018 Commonwealth Games
Medallists at the 2022 Commonwealth Games